Milan Šenoa (July 2, 1869 – November 16, 1961) was a Croatian writer and geographer.

He was a son of the prominent writer August Šenoa. After graduating at the Faculty of Philosophy, Zagreb. He started working as a professor of geography in 1892, and received tenure in 1892.

He was the head of the Geographic Institute in the period 1922-1940. He authored more than 50 works in physics, social geography, travelogues as well as numerous popular-science articles and several novels.

In the book "Liebesgeschichten der slawischen Völker", Gerhard Stalling Verlag 1959, is mentioned, that the author died in 1940 (see above "He was the head of the Geographic Institute in the period 1922-1940."

Works
 Rijeka Kupa i njezino porječje, 1895
 Pontsko-jadranska razvodnica, 1900
 Razvedenost istarskih i dalmatinskih otoka
  Tipovi naših gradova, 1930
 Kvarnerske pripovijesti
 Exodus (novel)
 Iz kobnih dana (novel)

References

1869 births
1961 deaths
Academic staff of the University of Zagreb